This is a list of seasons completed by the Chicago Rush. The Rush are a professional arena football franchise of the Arena Football League (AFL), based in Chicago, Illinois and play their home games at Allstate Arena. The team was established in 2001. The height of the franchise's history came in the 2006 season, when the Rush won ArenaBowl XX, which is their only ArenaBowl appearance to date. Prior to the 2009 season, the AFL announced that it had suspended operations indefinitely and canceled the 2009 season. Later in 2009, it was announced that the Rush would return for the 2010 season, when the league relaunched.

References
General
 

Specific

Arena Football League seasons by team
Chicago Rush seasons
Illinois sports-related lists
Chicago-related lists